Eel River may refer to:

Rivers
Eel River (California), which flows into the Pacific Ocean near Eureka, United States
South Fork Eel River, which flows into the Eel near Weott, California
East Branch South Fork Eel River
Eel River (Wabash River), in northern Indiana, United States
Eel River (White River), in southern Indiana, United States
Eel River (Massachusetts), which flows into Plymouth Harbor, United States

Other uses
Eel River, Clay County, Indiana, United States, an unincorporated community
Eel River Bar First Nation, a First Nation located in Northern New Brunswick, Canada
Eel River Crossing, New Brunswick, Canada, a village in Restigouche County
Eel River tribe, a sub-set of the Miami people of Indiana, United States
Eel River Athapaskan peoples, a group of closely related tribal peoples in California, United States

See also 
 Eel (disambiguation)
 Eel River Township (disambiguation)